Fatehpur  Sikri Assembly constituency is one of the  403 constituencies of the Uttar Pradesh Legislative Assembly, India.  It is a part of the Agra district and one of the five  assembly constituencies in the Fatehpur Sikri Lok Sabha constituency. First election in this assembly constituency was held in 1957 after the "DPACO (1956)" (delimitation order) was passed in 1956. After the "Delimitation of Parliamentary and Assembly Constituencies Order" was passed in 2008, the constituency was assigned identification number 91.

Members of the Legislative Assembly

Election results

2022

2017

16th Vidhan Sabha: 2012 Assembly  Elections

See also
Agra district
Fatehpur Sikri Lok Sabha constituency
Sixteenth Legislative Assembly of Uttar Pradesh
Uttar Pradesh Legislative Assembly
Vidhan Bhawan

References

External links
 

Fatehpur Sikri
Assembly constituencies of Uttar Pradesh
Constituencies established in 1956
Politics of Agra district